Dražovice is a municipality and village in Klatovy District in the Plzeň Region of the Czech Republic. It has about 200 inhabitants.

Gallery

References

Villages in Klatovy District